Géza Horváth (23 November 1847 –  8 September 1937) was a Hungarian doctor and entomologist internationally recognized for his work on bugs (Hemiptera). He also contributed extensively to the study of Hungarian scale insect fauna. He published over 350 papers in his lifetime.

He was made director of the newly established National Phylloxera Research Station in Budapest in 1880, where he did research on aphids, Phylloxera and psyllids. He continued as director after it was renamed The State Entomological Station and broadened its focus to other kinds of noxious insects.

In 1896 he returned to the Hungarian National Museum, where he was director of its Zoology Department until he retired. He remained active in entomology after retirement, and was president of the 10th International Zoological Conference when Budapest hosted it in 1927 (his 80th year).

A species of lizard, Iberolacerta horvathi, is named in his honor. A species of millipede, Iulus (Cylindroiulus) horvathi (https://myriatrix.myspecies.info/myriatrix/iulus-cylindroiulus-horvathi) was also named in his honor by Karl Wilhelm Verhoeff (1897: 467) (https://www.biodiversitylibrary.org/page/42868706).

References

Hungarian entomologists
1847 births
1937 deaths